The 1908 United States presidential election in Delaware took place on November 3, 1908. All contemporary 46 states were part of the 1908 United States presidential election. State voters chose three electors to the Electoral College, which selected the president and vice president.

Delaware was won by the Republican nominees, former Secretary of War William Howard Taft of Ohio and his running mate James S. Sherman of New York.

Results

Results by county

See also
 United States presidential elections in Delaware

References

Notes

Delaware
1908
1908 Delaware elections